The 2019 Valentin Granatkin Memorial Cup is its 19th edition after dissolution of the USSR. The tournament was held at Saint Petersburg, Russia from 4 to 14 June 2019, being organised by Russian Football Union.

Participating nations
Total of 12 National U-18 teams from three different confederations namely AFC, CONMEBOL and UEFA, participated in this edition of the tournament. The teams are further divided in three different groups, where Group A have Bulgaria, India, Moldova and host Russia, Group B have Kyrgyzstan, Kazakhstan, Turkey and Greece and Group C have Argentina, Iran, Armenia and second team of host Russia as Russia 2.

Group stage
All times are Further-eastern European Time (UTC+03:00).
The participants will play each other in each group and the winners of each group and the best of the teams finished second in each group will play for the semifinals. The remaining teams will play for 5–8 places.

Group A

Group B

Group C

Placement matches

Places 9–12

11th Place

9th Place

Places 5–8

7th Place

5th Place

Semifinals

Third place

Final

Final ranking

Goalscorers

References

External links

 

Valentin Granatkin Memorial
2019 in association football
2018–19 in Russian football
Granatkin Memorial